The Roman Catholic Diocese of Maliana is a diocese of the Roman Catholic Church in East Timor and a suffragan diocese of the Archdiocese of Díli. The diocese includes the administrative region of Maliana in districts of Liquica, Bobonaro, and Cova–Lima and 16 sub-districts.

On 30 January 2010 the Vatican erected a third diocese in East Timor. Fr. Norberto do Amaral was nominated the first bishop of the newly created Diocese of Maliana. The diocese is formed of 10 parishes serving just over 200,000 Catholics, who represent more than 98% of the area's population. Six diocesan and 25 non-diocesan priests, along with 108 religious brothers and sisters, are assigned within the diocese's limits. The Diocese of Dili was divided to create the diocese.

The diocese has 11 parishes with 10 pre-schools, 50 primary schools and 12 high schools. There are 15 diocesan priests, 62 religious men and 91 religious women. There are also 40 seminarians and 157 full-time catechists in the diocese.

In 2017, the diocese became home to the St. Joseph Seminary, Maliana, the country's second minor seminary.

The diocese is also home to the Don Bosco Co-educational Technical School started in 2013. The school had 106 students enrolled in 2018 while 60 had already graduated.

The Don Bosco Agricultural College is also located in Fuiloro in the diocese. Three fourths of the people of Fuiloro depend on agriculture. In 2018, 200 students study at the college.

References

External Links
Catholic Hierarchy

Roman Catholic dioceses in East Timor
Christian organizations established in 2010
Roman Catholic dioceses and prelatures established in the 21st century
Maliana
2010 establishments in East Timor